Cadley, Wiltshire can refer to two places in Wiltshire, England:

 Cadley, Collingbourne Ducis
 Cadley, Savernake

See also 
 Chute Cadley